Lộc Thủy may refer to several places in Vietnam, including:

Lộc Thủy, Quảng Bình, a rural commune of Lệ Thủy District.
, a rural commune of Phú Lộc District.